The Marsh House is a colonial revival vernacular built in 1930.  It is part of the City of Fairfax Historic District and currently is used as a commercial building.

Notes

External links 

National Historic Landmarks in Virginia
National Register of Historic Places in Fairfax, Virginia
Colonial Revival architecture in Virginia
Houses on the National Register of Historic Places in Virginia
Houses completed in 1930
Houses in Fairfax, Virginia
Historic district contributing properties in Virginia